"Pretty Girls" is the third official single from Wale's debut album, Attention Deficit, and is produced by Best Kept Secret. It features Gucci Mane and Weensey from the go-go band Backyard Band. It was released to iTunes and Rhapsody on October 6, 2009. The song samples Backyard Band's go-go rendition of The Moments and The Whatnauts track "Girls" and contains a line of UCB's song "Splash Girl". The official remix featuring Chris Brown and Fabolous was released on April 13, 2010. A second remix features Weensey, Raheem DeVaughn, and Phil Ade.

The music video was filmed in Los Angeles, California and was directed by Chris Robinson. Gucci Mane does not appear in the video due to his serving a one-year prison sentence at the time. There are appearances in the video by Washington Redskins' running back Clinton Portis, Baltimore Ravens' running back Ray Rice, Curren$y, DJ Khaled and actor Tristan Wilds.

Charts

References

External links
 Wale – Pretty Girls Music Video

2009 singles
2010 singles
Wale (rapper) songs
Gucci Mane songs
Music videos directed by Chris Robinson (director)
2009 songs
Songs written by Gucci Mane
Songs written by Wale (rapper)